The 2004 Palopo cafe bombing was a terrorist attack that occurred on January 10, 2004 in Palopo, South Sulawesi, Indonesia. Occurring at 10:30 p.m. local time (UTC+8), an improvised explosive device beneath table number 11 in the Sampoddo Indah karaoke cafe. The blast killed four people and injured three others. Four men, including Jasmin bin Kasau, were arrested for the bombings. Bin Kasau was sentenced to 20 years imprisonment but later escaped.

The attack 
On January 10, 2004, they returned and sat at table No. 11, located near the entrance, and ordered drinks, which they left unfinished. A device, thought to have been remotely detonated, exploded at 10:30 p.m. local time (UTC+8), from underneath that table.

The blast killed four people and injured three others. Three of the deceased, later identified as Abdul Rahman, Ambo, and Sumarni, 39, were residents of Palopo, while another, Suratman, was from another city. Most of the cafe's clients escaped through the back door prior to the arrival of the police.

Investigation 
Two men were identified by the police after questioning 17 witnesses on the next day, with preliminary sketches. Eighteen days later, police arrested four suspects and charged them with the bombing. Another 10 suspects were sought, and police expressed that the suspects had participated in a Laskar Jihad-run training camp in Poso Regency, Central Sulawesi, together.

On February 1, Jasmin bin Kasau was arrested in Noling village, Luwu regency. He later confessed to the bombing, calling it "part of a jihad against vice in nightclubs and bars." Several pieces of evidence were seized from bin Kasau, including an FN MAG gun, some ammonium nitrate and several pipes. Bin Kasau, along with three accomplices, was sentenced to 20 years imprisonment. However, bin Kasau later escaped from Gunungsari Penitentiary, Makassar, in 2007.

See also 
 List of terrorist incidents, 2004
 Terrorism in Indonesia

References 

Mass murder in 2004
2004 crimes in Indonesia
Terrorist incidents in Indonesia in 2004
Car and truck bombings in Indonesia
History of South Sulawesi
Islamic terrorism in Indonesia
Islamic terrorist incidents in 2004